The Blue Flowers, also known as Between Blue and Blue (original French title: Les fleurs bleues), is a French novel written by Raymond Queneau in 1965.

The English translation is by Barbara Wright, who also translated Queneau's Zazie in the Metro. The Italian translation was by Italo Calvino.

Plot introduction
The Duke of Auge dreams that he is Cidrolin, living on a barge alone with his daughter, while Cidrolin dreams that he is the Duke of Auge, travelling through the history of France. They will meet in 1964. Carl Reinecke, a critic writing for the London Times, has argued that this novel is an example of  the archetypal "prodigal son" storyline.

1965 novels
Novels by Raymond Queneau